Amelia Pincherle Rosselli (16 January 1870 – 26 December 1954) was an Italian writer.

The daughter of Giacomo Pincherle Moravia and Emilia Capon, she was born Amelia Pincherle Moravia in Venice. Her family were wealthy non-practising Jews. Her nephew Alberto Moravia was also a writer.

She married Giuseppe Emanuele "Joe" Rosselli (1867–1911) in 1892. The couple had three sons; her sons Carlo and Nello became an anti-fascist activists. The couple moved to Vienna where her husband continued his studies in music. Her play Anima, staged in Turin in 1898, won a literary prize. The family moved to Rome and then Florence. The couple separated in 1903.

Her son Aldo was killed during World War I. Her other two sons, Carlo and Nello, were exiled because they were opposed to fascism; they were later assassinated in 1937. Rosselli exiled herself from Italy, moving to  Switzerland, England and the United States. She returned to Italy in 1946.

She died in Florence at the age of 84. Her granddaughter Amelia Rosselli became a poet.

Selected works 
 El rèfolo, comedy (1909)
 San Marco, patriotic play (1913)
 Emma Liona, patriotic play (1924)

References 

1870 births
1954 deaths
20th-century Italian Jews
Italian women dramatists and playwrights
Italian anti-fascists
Italian feminists
Jewish anti-fascists
Jewish feminists
19th-century Italian Jews
20th-century Italian women writers